Amélie Mauresmo was the defending champion, but she retired from the sport on 3 December 2009.

Elena Dementieva won the title, defeating Lucie Šafářová in the final 6–7(5–7), 6–1, 6–4. This was Dementieva's final WTA singles title, before her retirement at the end of 2010.

Seeds
The top two seeds received a bye into the second round.

Draw

Finals

Top half

Bottom half

External links
Main Draw
Qualifying Draw

Singles 2010
Open GDF Suez - Singles